Maik Kuivenhoven (born 25 September 1988) is a Dutch professional darts player currently playing in Professional Darts Corporation (PDC) events.

Career

In 2018, he qualified for his first PDC European Tour event, when he won one of the eight West/South European qualifying slots for the 2018 German Darts Open. A second round defeat in Saarbrücken was the biggest achievement of Kuivenhoven's 2018, but in January 2019 he attempted PDC European Q-School attempting to win a two-year Tour Card. He finished seventh on the Order of Merit to win the final card available and seal at least two years on the PDC ProTour.

World Championship results

PDC
 2021: First round (lost to Matthew Edgar 0–3) 
 2022: Second round (lost to James Wade 1–3)

Performance timeline

PDC European Tour

References

External links

https://www.instagram.com/maik.kuivenhoven/

Living people
Dutch darts players
Professional Darts Corporation current tour card holders
1988 births
People from Naaldwijk
Sportspeople from South Holland
21st-century Dutch people